James Albert Rivers (born September 22, 1945) is a former American football linebacker who played eight seasons in the NFL. Rivers played college football at Bowling Green University.

Rivers was the St. Louis Cardinals fifth-round selection in the 1967 NFL Draft. He started nine games in 1968 and was named the Cardinals team Rookie of the Year. Rivers played in St. Louis from 1968-1973. He was traded to the New York Jets in 1974 where he played his last two seasons.

References

1945 births
Living people
American football linebackers
St. Louis Cardinals (football) players
New York Jets players
Bowling Green Falcons football players
Players of American football from Youngstown, Ohio